Es Semara is a province in the Moroccan economic region of Laâyoune-Sakia El Hamra, and the disputed territory of Western Sahara. Its population in 2004 was 60,426. Its major town is Es Semara.

Subdivisions
The province is divided administratively into the following:

References

 
Es Semara Province